The 50° Targa Florio took place on 8 May 1966, on the Circuito Piccolo delle Madonie, Sicily (Italy).

Race

The 50th anniversary edition of the Targa was marred by an inclement weather that turned the road into a quagmire. The winners of the 1965 edition, Nino Vaccarella and Lorenzo Bandini started as favorites driving the powerful, prototype-class Ferrari 330 P3. Indeed it seemed they could led Ferrari to another victory but two laps from the end, a wrong maneuver by Bandini while lapping a slower car resulted in the 330 off the road. This paved the way of the victory for the factory-backed Scuderia Filipinetti Porsche 906 of Herbert Müller and Willy Mairesse, followed by the Dino 206 S of Guichet/Baghetti, and another 906 of Sicilian duo Pucci/Arena.

Official results

References

Targa Florio
Targa Florio